Ida Island (also known as Ida's Isle) is a small island in the Sacramento–San Joaquin River Delta. It is part of Sacramento County, California. It appears on a 1978 USGS map of the area.

References

Islands of Sacramento County, California
Islands of the Sacramento–San Joaquin River Delta
Islands of Northern California